The Hindu Shahis (also known as Odi Shahis, Uḍi Śāhis, or Brahman Shahis, 822–1026 CE) were a dynasty that held sway over the Kabul Valley, Gandhara and western Punjab during the early medieval period in the Indian subcontinent. Details regarding past rulers can only be assembled from disparate chronicles, coins and stone inscriptions.

Scholarship 
Scholarship on Hindu Shahis remain scarce.

Colonial scholars—James Prinsep, Alexander Cunningham, Henry Miers Elliot, Edward Thomas et al.—had published on the Hindu Shahis, primarily from a numismatic perspective. The first comprehensive volume on the subject appeared in 1972 by Yogendra Mishra, a professor in the Department of History of Patna University; he explored the Rajatarangini meticulously but lacked in numismatics and paleography. The next year, Deena Bandhu Pandey—Professor of Art History at Banaras Hindu University—published his doctoral dissertation but his handling of Muslim sources, coins etc. were laden with errors, primarily stemming from an exclusive dependence upon English translations of Arabic/Persian chronicles. Both of these works are considered outdated and inaccurate, at large.

In 1979, Abdur Rehman received his PhD from Australian National University on "history, archaeology, coinage, and paleography" of the Turk Shahis and Hindu Shahis under the supervision of Arthur Llewellyn Basham. He has since published on the subject extensively and is considered to be an authority on the subject. In 2010, Michael W. Meister—Chair Professor of Art-History at UPenn—published a monograph on the temple-architecture of Sahis; he had worked with Rahman on multiple field investigations. In 2017, Ijaz Khan received his PhD from the School of Ancient History and Archaeology of the University of Leicester on "Settlement Archaeology of the Hindu Shahi[s] in North-Western Pakistan."

Sources

Literature 
No literature survives from Hindu Shahi courts. Unlike the case of Turk Shahis, only fragmented information can be obtained from chronicles of neighboring powers — Kashmir and Ghaznavi. Of the former, Kalhana's Rajatarangini (1148-1149) is the only extant source. Of the latter, we have Tārīkh al-Hind by Al-Biruni (c. 1030), Tārīkh-i Bayhaqī by Abu'l-Faḍl Bayhaqi (c. late 11th century), Zayn al-Akhbar by Abu Sa'id Gardezi, and Kitab-i Yamini by al-Utbi  (c. 1020).

Coins 

The Hindu Shahis issued silver coinage which underwent wide circulation from nearby Sindh to northeastern Europe. They were first "discovered" by James Tod, a British orientalist in 1822. Coins exhibit progressive debasement with time, with a regular decrease of silver content, allowing for the sequencing of the coinage. Early issues do not mention personal names but only generic titles, thereby not matching with the names found from literature. The characteristic motif of a horseman on the reverse with a bull on the obverse goes back to the Indo-Scythian ruler Azes I.

Inscriptions and archaeology 
A. R. Rahman of the Quaid-i-Azam University and Ahmad Hasan Dani did rudimentary field surveys in the late 1960s. Afterwards, the Italian Archaeological Mission in Pakistan (IAMP) have extensively surveyed the regions in and around Swat. In 1996, Khan and Meister obtained a license from Dept. of Archaeology for an "integrated study of Hindu-Śāhi sites"; excavation at Kafir-kot and field-surveys of the Salt Range were engaged in with aid from the University of Pennsylvania and the American Institute of Pakistan Studies.

Inscriptions remain scarce. Mostly found in Udabhanda, they either commemorate the commissioning of temples or are affixed at the base of idol-pedestals. Of the former kind—Mir Ali Inscription, Dewal Inscription, Dewai Inscription, Ratnamanjari Inscription, Veka Inscription, Hund Stone Inscription, Kamesvaridevi Inscription, Barikot Inscription, and Isvara Inscription—most are disfigured to various extents due to their use as grinding stones in medieval times and are decipherable only in parts. The latter kind is relatively abundant but only provides snippets of trivia. The language is exclusively Sharda. A samvat is mentioned in all of them whose zero year is understood to correspond to 822 C.E. based on the Zalamkot Bilingual Inscription; it has been assumed to be initiated by Kallar on his coronation, as was typically the case for most Hindu dynasties of medieval India. Copper land grants etc. are yet to be documented.

Origins

The 10th century Arab historian Masudi mentioned that in his time the kings of Gandhara were all called "" (which has been variously read Hajaj, J.haj or Ch'hach), while the area of Gandhara itself was called "country of the Rahbūt" (Rajputs). Elliot transliterated the character to "Hahaj" and Cunningham had it equated to the Janjua tribe/clan, who were held to be descendants of the Juan-Juan Khaganate. Rahman doubts this theory and instead transliterates to "J.haj", an Arabicised form of Chhachh, which is even today the name of the region around the Hindu Shahi capital of Hund. In the 10th century, this region was occupied by the tribe of the Gakhars/Khokhars, who formed a large part of the Hindu Shahi army according to the Persian historian Firishta. It would seem therefore that the Hindu Shahis were mainly Gakhars from the region of Chhachh in Gandhara.

Al-Biruni claimed that the Shahis were Brahmins. However this goes against Masudi's statement about Rajputs, as well as against Kalhana, whose contemporaneous Kshatriyas staked descent from the Hindu Shahis. Rahman speculates that either their Brahmin affiliation was a late rumor floated to justify their original usurpation of the throne, or they were fallen Brahmins, who ran afoul of caste-rules while discharging royal duties.

In a 2002 publication, Rahman accepted folklore among current inhabitants of Hund about pre-Muslim kings of the region belonging to the Hodi tribe, and proposed an Odi origin for the Hindu Shahi, namely the people of Oddiyana whose rulers were already known at the time of the Kushan Empire (3rd century CE) and are recorded as early as the 4th century BCE. He pointed to the famous Senvarma inscription as an evidence in support. Meister found Rahman's arguments to be convincing.

History

Establishment (822 CE): overthrow of the Turk Shahis 
The Abbasids led by caliph Al-Ma'mun defeated the Kabul branch of the Turk Shahis in 815 CE who had invaded into Khorasan. Following this defeat, the Turk Shahis not only had to convert to Islam but also had to cede key cities and regions. Another campaign against the Gandhara branch seems to have followed soon, with the Caliphate reaching as far East as the Indus river and imposing a critical defeat. A hefty annual tribute was to be paid in return for sovereignty rights to both territories.

The Turk Shahis ended up in a precarious state and in c. 822 CE, the last ruler Lagaturman was deposed by one of his ministers, a Brahmin vazir called Kallar. The sole description of events comes from Al-Biruni: Lagatarman's unbecoming manners had apparently led his subjects to lodge multiple complaints with Kallar, who having chanced upon a treasure trove, was rapidly purchasing his way to power. Kallar imprisoned the King for correction and became the acting regent before usurping the throne permanently. The new "Hindu Shahi" dynasty was thus established in Gandhara and Kabul. The Zabulistan branch of the Turk Shahis (the Zunbils), was unaffected by Al-Ma'mun's raids and continued to rule for about two more decades, before getting embroiled in the conflict to eventual extinction. None apart from Al-Biruni mentions Kallar; nothing is known about his rule or territorial extent or even his regnal dates. It has been proposed by many historians that "Kallar" was a misreading of the name "Lalliya", a Hindu Shahi ruler who is mentioned by Kalhana in some detail but Rahman rejects the hypothesis due to a total lack of chronological reconciliation.

In 1848, Thomas proposed that coins bearing the obverse legend "Spalapati" ("Warlord") were minted by Kallar; Cunningham accepted Thomas' arguments some 50 years later. In 1906, Vincent Arthur Smith relied on Edward Clive Bayley's misreading of the corrupted remains of a Bactrian legend as Arabic numerals to propose that coins bearing the legend "Samanta" ("Feudatory") were also minted by Kallar. He argued the "Spalapati" series to have been minted for circulation in Persian regions of his territory and the "Samanta" series for Sanskrit-speaking regions. Mishra agreed with Smith and adduced that Kallar may have felt insecure about the legitimacy of his rule as long as the imprisoned Turk Shahi ruler Lagaturman was alive, and hence affirmed his claim to leadership by such indirect epithets.

Rahman rejects all these hypotheses: that the horse-riding figures on the reverse of these coin series wore different headgears, they were different rulers. Also, shall Smith's argument be extrapolated, Bhimadeva, an otherwise well-documented ruler, should be equated to yet another title of Kallar. The "Spalapati" series may actually have been minted by the last Turk Shahi rulers; "Pati Dumi", who was defeated by Ma'mun, is described by Al-Azraqi and Al-Biruni as an "Ispahbadh" (Persian: Spahbad "Warlord"), equivalent to the title "Spalapati" (Sanskrit: Samarapati "Warlord"). He therefore believes that Kallar did not initiate any changes in the currency system of the last Turk Shahis and the Samanta series was minted by succeeding Hindu Shahi rulers. Numismatist and historian Michael Alram's publications in 2010 take note of this view; however, as of 2021, Alram attributes the entirety of the bull/horserider coinage, including the "Spalapati" series, to the Hindu Shahis.

Samanta
Al-Biruni notes that Samanta was the successor of Kallar, but their precise genealogical relationship is left undescribed. Like in the case of Kallar, there is a total lack of information on his rule or even his actual name. D.W. Macdowall argued that Al-Biruni telescoped him from the abundance of the Samanta series of coins; however, Rahman notes that if such were indeed the case, Al-Biruni should have followed a similar course for the equally abundant Vekka series.

The Samanta series prototype was followed by all future Hindu Shahi rulers—and even the Muslim Ghaznavids, who succeeded the Hindu Shahis—, leading Thomas to deem him as the greatest of Hindu Shahis. Rahman speculates that the loss of Kabul (see below) occurred under Samanta, since Kallar would have been too old by that time.

Loss of Kabul to Ya'qub (870 CE)
In 863, the Zunbils fell on the crosshairs of Ya'qub—an upstart military adventurer, who had recently established the Saffarid Empire and declared himself to be the Emir—as his employer-turned-foe Salih Nasr took refuge with them; a year later their combined forces were decimated by Ya'qub's relatively smaller army at Rukhkhaj. Like the Turk Shahis, Zunbils had to convert to Islam in lieu of being allowed to be installed as vassals and even then, Kbr—the son of the-then ruler—was imprisoned in Bust. 5 years hence, Kbr fled and recaptured Rukhkhaj temporally before being forced to flee into Kabul—in the Hindu Shahi territory—to thwart a chasing Ya'qub.

Late 870, Ya'qub marched onto Kabul and had Kbr captured, chasing him across cities. The list of cities traversed by Ya'qub in this chase and their precise sequence vary widely among sources to the extent that it is possible to doubt whether he had even conflicted with the Hindu Shahis if not for the widespread mention of his' bringing pagan idols and elephants from Kabul as a gift for the Caliphate.

"Khudarayaka" coinage
It is unknown what precise arrangements Ya'qub made for the governance of Kabul after his victory and imprisonment of the-then ruler; we only have Tarikh-i Sistan noting that Kabul was under an unnamed Ya'qub governor as late as 878/879. Rahman speculates that this governor was some blood-relation of Samanta who was favorably inclined to Islam and went on to take the title of Khudarayaka (Small King) as ascertainable from a bilingual series of coins. As has been the case with previous rulers, there is a total lack of information including about his actual name or course of rule or eventual fate. The unavailability of his coins in or around the Gandhara region probably points to his lack of control over those territories which did not bear the brunt of Ya'qub's expeditions — they were likely held by Samanta's relatives.

Recovery of Kabul and conflict with the Utpalas (c.900 CE)
Jawami ul-Hikayat remarks that the Logar Valley (close to Kabul) reverted to the Hindu Shahis towards the end of Amr al-Layth's reign (901), successor to Ya'qub. So, the Hindu Shahis appear to have had regained their territories sometime between 879 and 901. One Lalliya was described by Kalhana as a fearsome Hindu Shahi who commanded neighboring regions yet fell meekly to Kashmir — Rahman interprets Kalhana's description as an exaggeration of the qualities of the ruler who had won back independence. The capital shifted to Udabhanda probably because it was far from the Arabic frontier and easier to defend; however, a branch appears to have been installed at Kabul.

The Tarikh-i Sistan records two Indian "kings" — reconstructed by Rahman as Toramana and Asata — to have taken advantage of Amr al-Layth's preoccupation with rebellions in Khorasan, by successfully raiding Ghazna c. 900 CE, held by one governor named Fardaghan. However, the Jawami ul-Hikayat portrays a different story: Kamala, the "Rai of Hindustan" launched a retaliatory raid against Fardaghan who had desecrated temples but failed to win past the latter's ingenious use of propaganda to delay a faceoff until reinforcements arrived. Irrespective of the precise outcome, it is likely that both Toramana and Asata were Hindu Shahi governors operating under Lalliya, rather than kings in their own right.

Kalhana further notes that Lalliya was a significant ally of Gujarati ruler Alakhana against the machinations of the Utpala dynasty, whose ruler Samkaravarman eventually invaded the Hindu Shahis c. 902 CE. Though successful, Samkaravarman was killed by a stray arrow on his way back to Kashmir. A year later, his successor Gopalavarman re-invaded the Hindu Shahis to depose a "pretender to the throne" (Lalliya or Asata or ?), and installed Lalliya's son Toramana with the new name of "Kamaluka".

Kamaluka
Nothing definite is known about the reign of the Hindu Shahi ruler Kamaluka, except that he was succeeded by his son, Bhimadeva. Concurrent to his reign, the Saffarids rapidly lost their power to the Samanids and sometime after 913 CE, the power vacuum led to the rise of a friendly power in the Ghazna province, the Lawik dynasty, which flourished until 962 CE and engaged in marital ties with the Hindu Shahis. There are various unsubstantiated speculations regarding the end date of Kamaluka's reign, ranging from 900 to 950.

Bhimadeva: confrontations with Alp-Tegin and loss of Kabul (964 CE)

Mentioned as "Bhima" in Al-Biruni's list, and identified with the Śri Bhīmadeva coin series, Bhimadeva was perhaps the most accomplished ruler of the Hindu Shahis. His rise to power was concurrent with the growth of neighboring Hindu powers and there might have been conflicts; Mahipala of the Pala Empire had mounted a brutal invasion to adjacent regions, though it remains unclear whether he entered into a faceoff with the Hindu Shahis. This situation might have guided a marital alliance between Bhimadeva and the Utpalas of Kashmir, who would henceforth serve as an all-weather-friend of the Hindu Shahis. Bhimadeva's granddaughter Didda was married off to Kshemagupta and a temple was commissioned in their honor. They had a daughter who, according to Kalhana, was married to Simharaja, a Lohara chieftain.

Circa 962 Alp-Tegin, a rebel Turkish chief of the Samanid Empire who had lost out in a succession dispute, chose to venture out of Khorasan into the south of the Hindu Kush and attack Kabul, allegedly vowing to wage a Holy War (Jihad) against the "infidels" of Hind. The governor of Kabul — described in sources as "son of Kabul Shah" — was defeated and the son of Abu Ali Lawik, who had led a unit to support the Shahis, was captured and sent back with a message of peace. Lawik did not respond favorably and had to retreat to Ghazna proper, after being defeated by Tegin. There, he was besieged and compelled to surrender unconditionally but managed to escape soon.

Lawik made his way to Bhimadeva and having received additional troops, mounted a combined attack c. 963. Tegin's successor Abu Ishaq Ibrahim was expelled from Ghazna and Shahi-Lawik strongholds were restored in Kabul and adjacent areas. This victory appears to have been commemorated in the Hund Slab Inscription (HSI):

However, the celebrations were short-lived. Ibrahim returned with Samanid aid in September 964 and forced Lawik to flee. Bhimadeva probably perished in this conflict or soon after. The cryptic comment in the Hund Slab Inscription about how he was burnt by Shiva's desire rather than by the enemy, probably references some form of ritualistic suicide.

A new dynasty? 
Bhimadeva's successors would all have the surname of "Pala", and Muslim sources give hazy indications of a successional dispute, leading many to suggest that the same family was not ruling anymore. Rahman disagrees that there exist sufficient evidence in favor of such a hypothesis or conclusion.

One Vijayapaladeva (r. 942 or 963) is obtained from the Ratnamanjari Inscription where he is held to be the "supreme sovereign" (Maharajadhiraja). Rahman proposed that Vijayapaladeva had to have either belonged to the Kabul branch or had been some local Shahi feudatory. Khaw disagrees on the basis of his epithet and instead equates Vijayapaladeva with one Thakkana Sahi, mentioned by Kalhana as a contemporary rebel who had to be captured by Queen Didda of Kashmir. For Khaw, this identification fits within the narrative of Muslim sources; Jayapala ascended only after this threat was neutralized.

Rise of the Ghaznavids (977 CE onward)
In 969, Ibn Hawqal noted that new taxes were imposed on residents of Kabul in addition to a "tribute", after Alp-Tegin's invasion. Bilgetegin succeeded Abu Ishaq Ibrahim on the occasion of his death in November 966, and ruled for about nine years, before being assassinated during his invasion of Gardiz, the last bastion of the Lawiks. His successor Piri was a drunkard whose oppressive rule led the citizens of Ghazna to request the return of Lawik.

Lawik mounted yet another expedition with help from the "son of Kabul Shah" and met Muslim forces of Ghazni, Gardez, Bost, and Bamiyan in the area of Charkh. Both breathed their last in the war and the Muslim forces imposed an overwhelming victory, despite their numerical inferiority. Sabuktigin became the undisputed leader of the Ghazni region, as he would go on to overthrow Piri shortly. Kabul was lost forever and with the foundation stone of the Ghaznavid Empire being cast, the stage was laid for a perpetual conflict with the Shahis till their disintegration.

Jayapala 
In 986–987, Jayapala marched towards Ghazni and met with Sabuktigin's forces at Ghuzak.The war remained largely inconclusive for days before the tide turned against the Shahis: Jayapala was forced to propose a peace treaty. Mahmud, son of Sabuktigin and a battle commander, wished to inflict a decisive defeat, but had to concede when Jayapala threatened to incinerate all valuables. A war indemnity of one million Shahi dirhams and fifty war elephants was agreed upon and some frontier forts were ceded to the Ghaznavids. Accordingly, Jaypala made his way back with a few Ghaznavi commanders who were to take charge of the ceded forts, while some of his relatives and officials were left with Sabuktigin as hostages. Once Jayapala reached his own territories, he called off the treaty and threw the commanders into prison, probably hoping to force Sabuktigin into exchanging hostages.

Sabuktigin refused to believe that the treaty had been breached, but once it was established beyond doubt, he plundered the frontier town of Lamghan: temples were demolished and houses burnt down. In response, Jayapala secured troops from unidentified Rajahs, and met with the Ghaznavids near Kindi (modern day Kandibagh - ?). The Ghaznavids breached the enemy lines repeatedly using light attacks and followed them with an all-out assault, routing the Shahis who had to flee beyond the Indus despite their overwhelming numerical superiority. The entire span of territory up to Peshawar was lost, and Sabuktigin installed his own tax-collectors; local tribes were ordained into Ghaznavid arms too. A ribāṭ was commissioned at Kindi to commemorate the victory. However, Peshawar and adjacent regions returned to Shahis sometime soon, probably during what would be a long interlude in the Ghaznavid-Shahi conflict.

Circa 990–991, Mahmud would be imprisoned by his father Sabuktigin on grounds of fomenting a rebellion. Jayapala probably tried to leverage the rift in his favor by promising to rescue Mahmud, marry off his daughter to him, and further, allot sufficient wealth and troops. Mahmud did not respond favorably and noting the Shahi to be a doggy infidel, proclaimed his absolute devotion to Sabuktigin and pledged to attack Jayapala upon release. Around the same time, Jayapala was challenged by Bharat, a Rajah of Lahore who wished to wrest control of Nandana, Jailam and Takeshar. Anandapala, then Governor of Punjab, was ordered to intercept Bharat's forces and in the ensuing battle, Bharat was imprisoned and Lahore annexed; however the nobility of Lahore pleaded on behalf of their old King, who was reinstated as a feudatory after payment of tributes. About a year hence, Bharat's son Chandrak deposed him on the grounds of waging an ill-thought campaign against the Shahis, and became the new feudatory. For reasons which are not clear, c. 998-999 (eight years after the usurpation), Jayapala declared war against Lahore on the pretext of protecting his suzerain Bharat and dispatched Anandapala. Chandrak was ambushed and kidnapped around the battleground of Samutla, and Lahore was annexed by the Shahis. Rahman speculates that the Shahis were trying to balance their losses to the Ghaznavids using any pretext.

In 998, Mahmud ascended the Ghaznavid throne at Ghazni, and went on an annexation spree. Soon, Mahmud turned his eyes on the Shahis, allegedly resolving to invade their territories every year. In what was the last battle of his life, Jayapala met with Mahmud in the Battle of Peshawar on 27 September 1001; one Shahi governor of Bardari province named Adira Afghan is held to have switched sides and aided in the safe and quick passage of Mahmud's troops across Shahi provinces. Mahmud saw through Jayapala's tactics of delaying the conflict in the hope of receiving reinforcements and declared war immediately. Soon, the Shahis were in a state of disarray with Jayapala and fifteen of his relatives taken as prisoners. About one million Shahi forces were taken as slaves. The war-spoils awed contemporary chroniclers: the royal necklaces alone were valued at over six million Shahi dirhams. Mahmud continued his raid as far as Hund, as his forces chased fleeing troops and decimated pockets of resistance. Within a few months, the entire Shahi territory to the west of the Indus had submitted to Mahmud. By April 1002, Mahmud was on his way back to Ghazni.

Jayapala was eventually released but Muslim chroniclers differ about the specifics. Unsuri, a court-poet of Mahmud notes that he was sold in the slave market; Minhaj ad-din and al-Malik Isami adds a price of 80 dirhams/dinars. Others like al-Ansab note that Mahmud had rejected his request for pardon but allowed him to be free in lieu of a payment of 2.5 million dirhams and 50 war-elephants around March 1002, which Rahman finds more likely. Jayapala returned to Hund and immolated himself in a pyre after abdicating the throne in favor of Anandapala.

Anandapala: war and peace with Mahmud 

Anandapala ascended to the throne around April 1002. His capital city remains unknown but was likely Nandan. Anandapala had entered into marital relations with Tunga, the prime-minister of Didda, then-ruler of Kashmir and had at least two sons. He commanded significant fame as a patron of scholars though texts from his court are not extant.

Circa April 1006, Mahmud requested Anandapala to consent to the passage of his trrops via his territories to reach Daud, the ruler of Multan. He declined the request and even went to the extent of stationing troops on the banks of Indus to prevent Mahmud's crossing — an enraged Mahmud waged a cataclysmic war upon the Shahis and compelled Anandapala to escape to Kashmir (via Sodhra) before eventually finishing his original objective of conquering Multan. All these territories of "Hind" were left under the governorship of a certain Sukhapala, a neo-convert.

However, a couple of years hence, Sukhapala renounced Islam (c. late 1006) and declared rebellion. At this juncture, Anandapala tried to make space for himself by promising to aid Mahmud in containing Turk rebellions at the other side of his empire; apparently, he did not want a ruler who had defeated him, to be defeated by another. It is unknown whether Anandapala's offer was accepted but Mahmud stalled his chase of Ilaq Khan and turned his attention to the Shahis; Sukhapala offered negligible resistance before fleeing into Kashmur from where he was captured, fined, and imprisoned to death. It is likely that Anandapala was installed as the next Ghaznavid vassal.

Circa December 1008, Mahmud mounted an invasion of Hindu Shahis for reasons which are not clear. Anandapala sent a large army—probably, supplanted with neighboring troops—under the commandership of his son (Trilochanapala), who arrived in the plains of Chach but failed to prevent Mahmud's troops from crossing across the Indus. The Battle of Chach ended with the defeat of the Hindu Shahi troops. Mahmud chased the fugitive troops for months—seizing Nagarkot to collect his war-spoils, in the process—and even took a son of Anandapala as hostage. Governors were installed across the conquered provinces and Mahmud would return to Ghazni, only by June of the next year.

This would be the last military conflict of Anandapala; the next year, Anandapala sent an embassy to Mahmud. The proposal of peace was accepted and in return, Hindu Shahis were to accept tributary status, provide (limited) military support, guarantee passage of troops, and remit an annual tribute. Mahmud sent his own agents to oversee the enforcement of the peace treaty and within a year, normal trade relations had resumed. The death of Anandapala is not recorded in any chronicle; however, it can be ascertained to be c. late 1010 - early 1011. The fate of the son taken back to Ghazni remains unknown.

Trilochanapala and Bhimapala: overwhelming losses to Mahmud and disintegration 
Al-Biruni held that Trilochanapala had a favorable attitude towards Muslim subjects, unlike his father. Trilochanapala did not dishonor Anandapala's treaty, but when Mahmud wished to march towards Thanesar via Hindu Shahi territories, he proposed that the city be spared in lieu of a negotiated peace treaty. Mahmud rejected the request and sacked Thanesar with an uneventful passage via Shahi territories. However, as a consequence or otherwise, Trilochanapala soon stopped paying the annual tributes to Mahmud and declared war.

In November 1013, Mahmud progressed towards Hind to contain Trilochanapala but failed to make it across the snow-laden passes. Taking advantage of this delay, Trilochanapala tasked his son Bhimapala with arranging Shahi troops and went to Kashmir, where he received a battalion from king Sangramaraja of the Lohara dynasty, commanded by Tunga. The face-off happened in the middle of the following year. Bhimapala initially went about exploiting the local topography of a narrow mountain-pass in his favor, and launched stinging guerilla attacks on Mahmud's troops—to the extent of being referred to by Uth'bi as "Bhima, the Fearless", until he got confident of his numerical superiority and switched to open-warfare; in the mayhem that followed this tactical blunder, the Shahis were routed and Bhima had to flee.

The fortress at Nandana was sacked for war-spoils and a Ghaznavid governor was installed, while Mahmud went searching for Trilochanapala. Trilochanpala, in the meantime, had set up his base with Kashmiri forces on the banks of the Poonch River. An initial round of success against a Ghaznavid reconnaissance party contributed to Tunga's pride and he then mounted a disastrous maneuver without consulting experienced Shahi generals, ensuring another crippling defeat coupled with a total loss of territory, west of Tausi. Rahman noted this campaign to be the death-blow for the Hindu Shahis — "it was no longer a question of whether but a question of when" the Shahis would perish.

From the outset of his rule, Trilochanapala had chosen to expand into the Siwalik Hills to make up for the territories lost in his predecessors' conflicts with the Ghaznavids: this brought him into multiple conflicts with Chandar Rai of Sharwa. But the fatal encounter with Mahmud ensured that Trilochanapala had nowhere but the Siwaliks to retreat into and compelled him to enter into a peace treaty, even offering his son to be married to the daughter of Chandar. The offer was accepted but Bhima was imprisoned when he went to bring the bride home and Chandar asked for reparations. This brought an end to Trilochanapala's imperial ambitions in the Lower Himalayas for the time being though stray conflicts continued.

When Mahmud sacked Sharwa while returning from his Kanauj campaign (c. 1017), Trilochanapala is noted to have taken refuge with Paramara Bhoja. Sometime soon, significant polities in the Doab entered into treaties with one another and with the Hindu Shahis to ward off future invasions of a similar scale. Mahmud did not take kindly to these alliances and returned in October 1019. Trilochanapala's men were tasked by Vidyadhara of Chandela to prevent Mahmud's troops from crossing across the Ramganga (somewhere around Bulandshahr) and they took positions at the eastern bank but failed to execute the task. Subsequently, Trilochanapala planned to move away, probably to join Vidyadhara's forces for the main faceoff, but a swift charge by Mahmud's troops inflicted yet another resounding defeat. Bulandshahr was sacked and two of his wives and daughters imprisoned. He tried to enter into a peace-treaty but in vain, causing him to flee to Vidyadhara. It is not known whether he made it to the camp but Vidyadhara is noted to have deserted his posts by then.

In 1021, Trilochanapala, by then a ruler of little significance in all probabilities, was assassinated by his mutinous Hindu troops for reasons unknown. Bhimapala, who must have escaped the Rais sometime in between, succeeded him and continued to rule until 1026; nothing is known about his rule or territories.

Aftermath 

Adab al-harb—a manual of state-craft produced during the times of Iltutmish, which contains a host of unique information about the Ghaznavids—note that in 1040, one Sandbal, a grandson of the Kabul Shah, marched towards Lahore seeking to utilize the imprisonment of Masʽud I and resulting political instability to his favor. The armies met at Qadar Jur (var. Qalachur) and despite the Shahis having numerical superiority, they were defeated as their troops left the battle in a state of panic once Sandbal was assassinated by a Turk archer. He seemed to have been based around the Siwaliks and might have been a Shahi heir — many contemporary Muslim chronicles do mention a Hindu triumvirate to have unsuccessfully attacked the Ghaznavids around the same time but mention only two of the names, both petty Siwalik chieftains and not Sandbal.

Some Shahis migrated into Kashmir and gained prominent positions in their court.

Art and Architecture

Temples 
New temples were built inside fortresses while existing ones were extensively refurbished or repurposed. The Gandhar-Nagara style of architecture developed distinct formulations under the Hindu Shahis. Meister notes a typical Hindu Shahi temple to have two ground-level chambers embedded within a tower—leading to a minaret like appearance—with an ambulatory at the top, that is accessible by a stairwell. He dates construction of eight temples to the Hindu Shahis: one of the five temples at Kafir Kot (mid 9th c.), two temples at Amb (late 9th c. and 10th c.), one at Gumbat (10th c.), one at the Katas Raj complex (10th c.), two temples at Bilot (late 10th c.), and one at Nandana (early 11th c.; reuse of a sacred [Buddhist - ?] site).
Besides, there were two sandstone temples at Malot and Shiv-Gangā (10th c.) which exhibited a blend of Shahi and Kashmiri architecture, bearing testimony to the cultural flows between the two polities. All of these structures are in a state of ruin and have fallen into disuse since time immemorial; except for Kafir Kot, excavations need to be carried out to understand the architectural grammar of the Hindu Shahis in more detail.

Sculpture
Sculptures from the Hindu Shahi period are very scarce and any in-depth study is yet to be undertaken.

Forts and settlements 

The archaeology of the Hindu Shahis remains unrecognized and poorly understood. Dani ascribed ruined forts to the Hindu Shahis at Pehur, Kamala, and Bata, but without detailed reasoning. Hund remains the main archaeological site. Fragmentary evidence is located across the Peshawar valley. Excavations by Rahman (and others) documented a Buddhist monastery at Barikot, which was repurposed to a Hindu Shahi fort.

Society and Economy 
Shaivism was practiced by the Hindu Shahis and likely, was also the predominant religion; Saura was practiced by some subjects, as were Buddhism and Islam. Kabul exported cotton clothing and indigo. Silver was mined at Panjshir and smelted at Andarab.

See also
 History of the Punjab
 History of Pakistan

Notes

References

Sources

Medieval Afghanistan
History of Hinduism
Hinduism in Afghanistan
Hinduism in Khyber Pakhtunkhwa
Hinduism in Punjab, Pakistan
Kabul Shahi
Hindu dynasties
Former countries in Central Asia